The 2010 W-League Season was the league's 16th.  The regular season began in May and ended in July. The playoffs began in late July and ended in August.

Changes from 2009 season

Name Changes 
Two teams changed their name in the off-season:

Expansion Teams 
Three teams were added for the season:

Teams Leaving 
10 teams folded or left the league after the 2009 season:
 Boston Renegades
 Cary Lady Clarets
 Connecticut Passion
 FC Indiana
 Fort Wayne Fever
 Los Angeles Legends
 Minnesota Lightning
 Real Colorado Cougars
 Richmond Kickers Destiny
 Western Mass Lady Pioneers

Standings

Orange indicates W-League title and bye into W-League semifinals.
Purple indicates division title clinched
Green indicates playoff berth clinched
Yellow indicates team would qualify for playoffs in current position
Red indicates team is eliminated from playoffs

Central Conference

Great Lakes Division

Midwest Division

Eastern Conference

Atlantic Division

Northeast Division

Western Conference

Playoffs

Format
The W-League champion will earn an automatic bye into the W-League Semifinals, with the highest-placed team in the division not making the playoffs will earn a playoff berth.

The Central Conference will have 5 playoff spots.  The second and third place teams from the Great Lakes Division will play each other.  The winner will play the Midwest Division champions, while the Great Lakes Division champion will play the second place team of the Midwest Division.  The winners of those games will play to determine the conference champion. The Eastern Conference division champions will play the second place team of the opposite division, the winners facing off to determine who goes to the W-League Semifinals.  The Western Conference will have their top two teams facing off to determine their conference champion.

The W-League Semifinals will put the regular season champion against the lowest seeded conference champion, and the higher-ranked conference champions against each other. The winners of these games will play in the championship.

Conference Brackets
Central Conference

Eastern Conference

Western Conference

W-League Championship Bracket

Divisional Round

Conference semifinals

Conference finals

W-League Semifinals

W-League Third Place

W-League Championship

See also
United Soccer Leagues 2010
2010 PDL Season

References

2010
2
W